The Battle of the Angrivarian Wall was fought near Porta Westfalica, Germany in 16 AD between the Roman general Germanicus and an alliance of Germanic tribes commanded by Arminius. This battle followed immediately after the Battle of Idistaviso, and was supposedly sparked by Germanic outrage over the trophy erected on that prior battlefield by the Romans.

It was the final battle of a three-year series of campaigns by Germanicus in Germania. According to Tacitus, the battle was a victory for the Romans. Germanicus, now in winter quarters across the Rhine, wanted to renew the conquest in the Spring, but was recalled to Rome by Tiberius, now Rome's Emperor. In fact this final action led to a withdrawal of the Roman troops from territories of Germania east of the Rhine river effectively until the collapse of the Roman Empire.

Background

The Germanic chief, Arminius, had been instrumental in the organising of the Battle of the Teutoburg Forest, in which three Roman legions moving west to winter quarters were ambushed and annihilated by allied Germanic forces in the deep forests of western Germania. That defeat plagued the Roman psyche, and revenge and the neutralisation of the threat of Arminius were the impetus for Germanicus' campaign. In the year before the battle, 15 AD, Germanicus had marched against the Chatti and then against the Cherusci under Arminius. During that campaign, the Romans advanced along the region of the Teutoburg Forest, where the legions had been massacred and buried the bones of the Roman soldiers that still lay there. The eagle of the annihilated nineteenth legion was also recovered. The Germanic tribes generally avoided open large-scale combat, but by repeated Roman incursions deep into Germanic territory, Germanicus was able to force Arminius, at the head of a large but fractious coalition, into response. The Romans, along with the Chauci, who fought for Romans as auxiliaries, defeated the allied Germanic forces and inflicted heavy losses on them.

Opposing forces
Before the battle of Idistaviso, which took place a few days or weeks earlier, Germanicus had eight legions with auxiliary troops: among these, according to Tacitus, are the Germanic allies such as the Batavi (mainly as cavalry), Chauci and Celtic contingents such as Raeti, Vindelici and Gauls. Ampsivarii, Belgians and Frisians may also have been among the allies. In addition, archers and horse archers have been mentioned. The size of the allied contingents is unknown, but may have been significant. For the total number of troops of the campaign army in the year 16, Hans Delbrück assumes "no less than 50,000". Klaus-Peter Johne cites 80,000. Wolfgang Jungandreas explicitly placed 100,000 men too high for the battle of the Angrivarian Wall. 

Even more difficult is to establish the number of troops at the disposal of the Cherusci under Arminius. Overall, the coalition appears to have been stronger than the previous year. In essence, the Cheruschi allies would have been the tribes involved in the Battle of the Teutoburg Forest in 9 AD. Germanicus' military operations were directed against them in particular. It can therefore be assumed that the Bructeri and Marsi belonged to the coalition. In addition, Usipetes, Tencteri and Tubantes are counted among the allies.

Together with the Cherusci and the Angrivari, the Chatti belong to the three tribes that Tacitus particularly emphasizes in his account of the triumphal march of Germanicus in 17 AD: 

It is not clear if and how the Chatti joined the Arminius alliance in the summer of 16 AD. Due to their rivalry with the Cherusci, they may have taken part in the fighting by operating independently. If one calculates the number of warriors in the coalition using the data provided by Günter Stangl for the individual tribes, one gets from 40,000 to about 75,000.

Aftermath
The two battles of Idistaviso ended positively for the Roman army; the legions of Varus destroyed in Teutoburg were avenged and Germanicus also managed to recover two of the three eagles lost by the Romans in the defeat, but in reality Germanicus' campaign did not obtain decisive results. Tacitus asserts bitterly that a jealous Tiberius recalled Germanicus due to feeling threatened by a potential rise in his political appeal due to successes in avenging Teutoburg. According to other opinions, Germanicus was unable to remain permanently, despite his victories, east of the Rhine; in addition, his fleet had suffered heavy losses in a storm.

Tiberius considered that it was useless and wasteful to try again to conquer Germany as far as the Elbe river and therefore he recalled Germanicus; the emperor also believed that internal discords between the Germanic peoples would safeguard the integrity of the imperial borders on the Rhine better than a long and costly war of conquest.

Bibliography

Primary sources

Secondary sources

References

16
1st-century battles
Angrivarian Wall
Angrivarian Wall
Angivarian Wall
Military history of Germany
10s in the Roman Empire
Arminius
Cherusci
10s conflicts
Germanicus
Roman campaigns in Germania (12 BC – AD 16)